The Allagash River is a tributary of the Saint John River, approximately  long, in northern Maine in the United States. It drains in a remote and scenic area of wilderness in the Maine North Woods north of Mount Katahdin. The name "Allagash" comes from the Abenaki language, a dialect of the Algonquin languages, spoken by the Penobscot Tribe. The word, /walakéskʸihtəkʸ/, means "bark stream".

The Allagash issues from Churchill Lake (formerly known as Heron Lake) at Churchill Depot in northern Piscataquis County. In its natural state, it also drained Allagash, Chamberlain, and Telos lakes, but in the 1840s dams were built which diverted their drainage into the East Branch of the Penobscot River, to facilitate the shipping of logs south to coastal Maine. Lock Dam drains some water from Chamberlain Lake into the south end of Eagle Lake, which then flows out through the Allagash as it naturally would.

The Allagash flows generally northeast, passing through a chain of natural mountain lakes. It joins the Saint John from the south at Allagash, Maine, near the international border with New Brunswick. The relatively unspoiled nature of the river has long made it a popular destination for canoe trips. In 1857 Henry David Thoreau, along with his Concord friend Edward S. Hoar and Penobscot guide Joseph Polis, made a canoe journey which led him to the source of the river, i.e. Heron Lake. His account of the excursion called "The Allegash and East Branch" was published posthumously as the third chapter of The Maine Woods (1864).

In 1966, the citizens of Maine voted to protect the river by authorizing a $1.5 million bond that would "develop the maximum wilderness character" of the river. Much of the river was subsequently designated as the Allagash Wilderness Waterway. In 1970 the waterway became part of the National Wild and Scenic River program of the U.S. federal government. Although the wild designation of the river is normally applied to free-flowing streams, the designation left in place the wooden Churchill Dam for historic reasons. In the 1990s, with the dam failing, the citizens of Maine authorized a concrete replacement for the dam to preserve the nearby recreational facilities on the river. The rebuilding of the dam was highly criticized by environmentalists. The expansion of recreational access to the river through new roads and docks has remained a controversial topic in recent years.

Development in much of the area surrounding the Allagash Wilderness Waterway is restricted by the Seven Islands Land Company, a private land management company that owns approximately 1 million acres (4,000 km²) of forest in northern Maine.

Annual maximum flows occur during the spring snow melt and minimums in the fall.

References

External links
National Park Service; Allagash Wilderness Waterway 
USGS.gov: Real time Allagash River flow data
National Weather Service : Forecast of Allagash River levels and flow

 
Rivers of Aroostook County, Maine
Rivers of Piscataquis County, Maine
Tributaries of the Saint John River (Bay of Fundy)
North Maine Woods
Northern Forest Canoe Trail
Wild and Scenic Rivers of the United States